In the United States, Canada, Australia, and elsewhere, a pioneer cemetery is a cemetery that is the burial place for pioneers.  American pioneers founded such cemeteries during territorial expansion of the United States, with founding dates spanning, at least, from the late 18th to early 20th centuries.

A number of these have been officially designated as historic sites worthy of preservation, including at least 10 listed on the U.S. National Register of Historic Places (NRHP).

Definitions
The State of Iowa defines "pioneer cemetery" as "a cemetery where twelve or
fewer burials have taken place in the past 50 years".

The State of Nebraska defines an "abandoned or neglected pioneer cemetery" as having been founded or situated upon land that "was given, granted, donated, sold, or deeded to the founders of the cemetery prior to January 1, 1900", and that "contains the grave or graves of a person or persons who were homesteaders, immigrants from a foreign nation, prairie farmers, pioneers, sodbusters, first generation Nebraskans, or Civil War veterans".

The State of Oregon defines a "pioneer cemetery" as "any burial place that contains the remains of one or more persons who died before February 14, 1909", which is the 50th anniversary of Oregon's statehood.

California recognizes that pioneer cemeteries may have become the responsibility of a public cemetery district or  may be dedicated by the city or county as a pioneer memorial park if no longer maintained. The law also authorizes the "removal of such copings, improvements, and embellishments which the governing board finds to be a threat or danger to the health, safety, comfort, or welfare of the public."

List of pioneer cemeteries
Dates are of official founding or earliest known burial.

Australia
 Memorial Park Cemetery (1836), Albany, Western Australia; also known as Pioneer Cemetery

Canada
Buxton Pioneer Cemetery (1859–2015), Chatham-Kent, Ontario
Pioneers Cemetery in Stanley Park (c. 1886), Stanley Park, Vancouver, British Columbia
St. Mary's Pioneer Cemetery (1876), Calgary, Alberta
Whitehorse Pioneer Cemetery (1900)

United States

Arizona

 Adamsville A.O.U.W. Cemetery (1894), Pinal County
 Double Butte Cemetery (1888), Tempe; whose pioneer section is NRHP-listed
 Fry Pioneer Cemetery (1919), Sierra Vista; NRHP-listed in Cochise County
 Henry Wickenburg Pioneer Cemetery (1902), Wickenburg; NRHP-listed in Maricopa County
 Hardyville Cemetery (c. 1867), Bullhead City
 Pioneer and Military Memorial Park (1871), Phoenix, Arizona
 Evergreen Cemetery (c. 1912), Bisbee
 Pioneer Cemetery, Bisbee

Arkansas
 Palarm Bayou Pioneer Cemetery (c. 1837), Morgan, Arkansas, NRHP-listed

California
 Centerville Pioneer Cemetery (1850s), Fremont 
 Chevra Kaddisha Cemetery, Sacramento (1850), first Jewish cemetery in the state
 Dublin Pioneer Cemetery (1859), Dublin 
 Evergreen Cemetery (1877), Los Angeles 
Evergreen Cemetery (1850s), Santa Cruz 
Golden Gate Cemetery (1870–1909), San Francisco 
Holy Cross Cemetery (1887), Colma 
 Holy Cross Cemetery (1860s), Menlo Park 
 Jackson Pioneer Jewish Cemetery (1857), Jackson 
 Lone Mountain Cemetery (1854), San Francisco; which had included four cemeteries within the complex.
 Long Beach Municipal Cemetery, Signal Hill
 Marysville Hebrew Cemetery (1855), Marysville 
 Mount Eden Cemetery (1860), Hayward 
 New Helvetia Cemetery (c. 1845), Sacramento 
 Nevada City Jewish Cemetery (1854), Nevada City
 Pioneer Cemetery (c. 1851), Nevada City 
 Pioneer Cemetery (c. 1851), San Andreas
 Pioneer Memorial Cemetery (1857), San Bernardino
 Placerville Union Cemetery (1871), Placerville 
 Oak Hill Memorial Park, San Jose (1847), the oldest secular cemetery in California
 San Fernando Pioneer Memorial Cemetery (1850s), Los Angeles 
 San Lorenzo Pioneer Memorial Park, also known as San Lorenzo Pioneer Cemetery, San Lorenzo (managed by the Hayward Area Historical Society)
Santa Clara Mission Cemetery (1777), Santa Clara
 Sierra Madre Pioneer Cemetery (1882), Sierra Madre 
Sonora Hebrew Cemetery (c. 1851), Sonora
Union Cemetery (1859), Redwood City 
 Woodlawn Memorial Park Cemetery, Colma (1905), many early graves from San Francisco were relocated here.
Yosemite Cemetery (1870s), Mariposa County
Odd Fellows or Masonic Pioneer (1865), Fallbrook

Florida
 Houston Pioneer Cemetery (1883), Eau Gallie

Indiana
 Pioneer Cemetery (part of Lincoln Boyhood National Memorial and gravesite of Nancy Hanks Lincoln), Lincoln City

Maine
Pioneer Cemetery (1731), Yarmouth

Nebraska
 Mormon Pioneer Cemetery (1840s), Omaha
 Prospect Hill Cemetery (1856), Omaha

New York
 Pioneer Cemetery, Canandaigua
 Pioneer Cemetery (1810), Evans Center; NRHP-listed
 Pioneer Cemetery (1787), Sidney; NRHP-listed

Ohio
 Pioneer Memorial Cemetery (1790), Cincinnati, Ohio

Oregon
 Eugene Masonic Cemetery (1859), Eugene
 Eugene Pioneer Cemetery (1872), Eugene; NRHP-listed
 Fernwood Pioneer Cemetery, Newberg; NRHP-listed
 Grand Army of the Republic Cemetery (1882), Portland
 Gresham Pioneer Cemetery (1859), Gresham
 Hargadine Cemetery (1867), Ashland
 Hillsboro Pioneer Cemetery (1870), Hillsboro
 Lebanon Pioneer Cemetery, Lebanon; NRHP-listed, NRHP-listed in Linn County
 Lee Mission Cemetery (1842), Salem
 Lone Fir Cemetery (1855), Portland
 River View Cemetery (1882), Portland
 Salem Pioneer Cemetery (1850s), Salem

Texas
 Der Stadt Friedhof (1846), Fredericksburg
 Founders Memorial Cemetery (1836), Houston
 Pioneer Park Cemetery (1849), Dallas

Washington
 Bothell Pioneer Cemetery (1889), Bothell; NRHP-listed
 Chamber's Prairie-Ruddell Pioneer Cemetery, Lacey; NRHP-listed, NRHP-listed in Thurston County
 Union Cemetery-Pioneer Calvary Cemetery, Tumwater; NRHP-listed, NRHP-listed in Thurston County

See also
 Pioneer Cemetery (disambiguation)
 List of cemeteries in the United States

References

Cemeteries
American pioneers